Henry House Hill is a location near Bull Run in Virginia. Named for the house of the Henry family that sits atop it, the hill begins near the road of Centreville, Virginia, after Gainesville, Virginia, to the today's U.S. Route 29, the Warrenton Turnpike. It is a slow, constant rise toward the south over a length of approximately 730 meters. This hill was an important site of the battles of First and Second Bull Run (also known as First and Second Manassas) in the American Civil War. The battle raged on the north side of the hill in predominantly open grass country; the south side was relatively closely covered with trees. The hill received its name from Dr. Isaac Henry, who lived with his family in a house on the plateau of the hill. On July 21, 1861, the house was inhabited by his widow, Judith Carter Henry, and their two sons. The 85-year-old woman was bed-ridden and unable to leave the house. Mrs. Henry was mortally wounded when a projectile of the Union artillery crashed through the bedroom wall and tore off one of her feet and inflicted multiple injuries, from which she died later that day.

During the First Battle of Bull Run, Brig. Gen. Thomas J. Jackson and his Confederate soldiers had taken up positions on Henry House Hill. During the battle General Jackson was pushed off of the hill many times by the 14th Brooklyn. The General gave the 14th its famous nickname, "Red Legged Devils" because of their striking red pantaloon trousers. Brig. Gen. Irvin McDowell, commander of the Federal forces, had been ordered by Abraham Lincoln to engage a large Rebel force that was led by Brig. Gen. P.G.T. Beauregard in an effort to end the Civil War with one decisive battle. Union soldiers had been ordered up the hill. Under huge amounts of enemy fire the Southerners held back the Federal soldiers with heavy losses. Brig. Gen. Barnard Bee shouted to his men, "There is Jackson standing like a stone wall. Let us determine to die here, and we will conquer. Follow me." That gave Thomas Jackson the famous nickname Stonewall. In the retreat from the hill, a Union wagon tipped over on Cub Run Bridge, blocking the Federal retreat, causing many of the undisciplined volunteers to drop their rifles and run.

Henry House Hill is preserved as part of the Manassas National Battlefield Park.

External links

 Protected areas of Prince William County, Virginia
 Hills of Virginia
 Manassas campaign
 Manassas National Battlefield Park
 Historic American Buildings Survey in Virginia